Marie Reiners is a German screenwriter and author, as well as the creator of the TV series Mord mit Aussicht and Heiter bis tödlich: Morden im Norden.

Career
Reiners attended the University of Cologne from 1990, where classmate Hella Kemper encouraged her to work as a writer. During her undergraduate degree, Reiners was credited writer for three shows, including Alles Nichts Oder?!. Reiners then wrote for various shows and created the successful satirical crime series Mord mit Aussicht about a police station in the Eifel region.

Reiners first novel, Frauen, die Bärbel heißen (Women called Bärbel), was published in 2019 and tells the story of a 54-year-old taxidermist.

Filmography

Publications
 Frauen, die Bärbel heißen (2019, S. Fischer Verlag)

References

External links

Living people
German screenwriters
German women screenwriters
People from Mönchengladbach
21st-century German women
Year of birth missing (living people)
University of Cologne alumni